Footballers' Wives: Extra Time (stylised as footballers wive$: extra time) is a British drama programme. A spin-off of Footballers' Wives, the programme aired on ITV2 for two series. Footballers' Wives: Extra Time aired in the United States on BBC America under the title  Footballers' Wives: Overtime.

Background
Footballers' Wives: Extra Time is the racy drama spin-off to award-winning original series, Footballers' Wives. Picking up from the end of Footballers' Wives Series 4. It aired on ITV2.

Episodes
With success of the first series, ITV2 increased the episode lengths by 10 minutes and ordered 1 more than the first series.

The original episode line-up of series two consisted of 18 episodes at 20–25 minutes each. However, there is no explanation as to why the 18 episodes were put into 13 extended episodes for airing.

Both series aired on Thursdays at 10:00 pm, though for some episodes the time varied.

Cast
 Georgina Mellor as Anika Beevor (Series 1-2)
 Travis Oliver as Oliver Ryan (Series 1-2)
 Frances Da Costa as Yasmin Salter (Series 1-2)
 Marc Hendrey as Rees Salter (Series 1-2)
 Sarah Matravers as Joly Salter (Series 1-2)
 Tom Swire as Seb Webb (Series 1-2)
 Dominique Moore as Channel O'Grady (Series 1-2)
 Jack Pierce as Cash Brown (Series 1-2)
 Ben Richards as Bruno Milligan (Series 1-2)
 Helen Latham as Lucy Milligan (Series 1-2)
 Nicholas Ball as Gary Ryan (series 1-2; crossed over to series 5 of Footballers' Wives)
 Peter Ash as Darius Fry (Series 2)
 Julie Legrand as Janette Dunkley (Series 2)
 Louise Plowright - Michelle Thorn (Series 1)
 Alice Bird as Lizzy Robinson (Series 2)
 Ross Finbow as Woody (Series 2)
 Marc Bannerman as Matt Bryant (Series 1-2)

Special guest stars
 Sarah Barrand as Shannon Lawson (Series 1-2)
 Laila Rouass as Amber Gates (Series 1)
 Jamie Davis as Harley Lawson (Series 1)
 Elaine Glover as Katie Jones (Series 1)
 Craig Gallivan as Callum Watson (Series 2)
 Angela Ridgeon as Trisha Watson (Series 2)
 Courtney Akers - Angelica Milligan (Series 1-2)

Connected characters
These characters are connected to characters from the main series, Footballers' Wives

DVD releases
Acorn Media have announced they will release both series of Footballers Wives Extra Time with the 'Footballers Wives: Complete Collection' box set in August 2012.

{| border="2" cellpadding="2" cellspacing="0" style="margin: 0 1em 0 0; background: #f9f9f9; border: 1px #aaa solid; border-collapse: collapse; font-size: 95%;"
|- style="background:#EFEFEF"
| colspan="5" | Footballers' Wives Extra Time - Series 1 & 2 |-
| rowspan="5" align="center" width="150" |
| align="center" width="150" colspan="3"| Set Details| width="150" align="center" |Special Features|-valign="top"
| colspan="3" align="left" width="400"| 
 30 Episodes
 4-Disc Set
16:9 Anamorphic Aspect Ratio
Subtitles: English
English (Dolby Digital)
| rowspan="4" align="left" width="300"|
 This set contains no special features.
|-
| colspan="3" align="center" | Release dates'|-
|align="center" | United Kingdom
|-
|align="center" | 11 June 2012
|}

The Series 2 release in Australia has the original episode-plan of 18 episodes. However, the release of the Second half boxset has the aired version of 13 extended episodes (30 minutes).

Foreign audience
In the United States, BBC America has aired the first season, although it is known in the US as Footballers Wive$: Overtime''. In Israel, the 2 seasons aired on channel Yes+. In Estonia, the first season is aired on Kanal 2.

Reception
Lucy Maher from Common Sense Media stated it was "Tacky, over-the-top trash is painful to watch".

References

External links
 Footballers' Wives: Extra Time Official website
 Shed Insider
 

2005 British television series debuts
2006 British television series endings
2000s British drama television series
British sports television series
British television spin-offs
English-language television shows
Extra Time
ITV television dramas
Television series by Warner Bros. Television Studios
Television shows set in England